Giorgianni is an Italian surname, derived from the given name Giorgio (George). Notable people with the surname include:

Edward J. Giorgianni (born 1944), American imaging scientist
Sal Giorgianni, American saxophonist

Italian-language surnames
Patronymic surnames
Surnames from given names